Nannophrys is a genus of frogs endemic to Sri Lanka. It used to be placed in the large frog family Ranidae but a phylogenetic study was undertaken using DNA sequences and it is now included in the family Dicroglossidae. They are sometimes known under the common name streamlined frogs.

Ecology
Nannophrys species are flat-bodied frogs that are adapted to live among narrow, horizontal rock crevices near clear-water streams.

Species
Four species are placed in the genus:
 Nannophrys ceylonensis Günther, 1869
 †Nannophrys guentheri Boulenger, 1882 (extinct)
 Nannophrys marmorata Kirtisinghe, 1946
 Nannophrys naeyakai Fernando, Wickramasinghe, and Rodrigo, 2007

References

 
Dicroglossidae
Amphibians of Asia
Endemic fauna of Sri Lanka
Amphibian genera
Taxa named by Albert Günther